Maurice Joseph Barry was a politician in Brisbane, Queensland, Australia. He was Mayor of Brisbane in 1924–1925.

The former mayor, died in Brisbane on the June 3, 1954 at the Mater Misericordia Private Hospital.  He had been unwell for sometime.  Mr. Maurice Barry, a former Mayor of Brisbane, died  aged 54.   Maurice Joseph Barry was the first Labor First Labour Mayor of the City of Brisbane.

He joined the Labour movement, and became president of the Federal executive of the Australian Labour Party. Later he became an alderman of the Brisbane City Council. He resigned to tour abroad, and was re-elected alderman on his return. He became first Labour Mayor with a majority of 5000 votes, and was Mayor at the time of the city's centenary celebrations. His name is commemorated by Barry Parade, Fortitude Valley, Queensland.

He was born and educated in Ireland and come to Australia in 1901.

References

Mayors and Lord Mayors of Brisbane